The Aeropolis 2001 is a proposed 500-story high-rise building over Tokyo Bay in Japan, envisioned by Obayashi Corporation.

The Aeropolis 2001 was proposed in 1989, amid a spate of similar projects for incredibly large buildings. All were proposed during the Japanese asset price bubble, which ended in the early 1990s.

At the time it proposed Aeropolis 2001, Obayashi Corp. also proposed building a city on the moon by 2050. Newspapers have reported little on either proposal since 1995.

Proposed details
Newspapers reported that plans called for the building to have 500 floors accommodating over 300,000 working inhabitants and 140,000 live-in residents. The structure was expected to be mixed-use, including restaurants, offices, apartments, cinemas, schools, hospitals, and post offices. It would have offered eleven square kilometers of floor space.

A shuttle lift, with 300 seats, would have gone from the ground floor to the top floor in 15 minutes, and stopped at every 40th floor. The proposal called for the tower to be fully sustainable and air conditioned.

See also
Arcology
Bionic Tower
Bionic architecture
Sky City 1000
X-Seed 4000

References

External links
Aeropolis 2001 at Emporis Buildings

Further reading
 Soars, John & Liz. "Unit 9". Headway pre-intermediate, pp. 65

Proposed skyscrapers in Japan
Unbuilt buildings and structures in Japan
Skyscrapers in Tokyo